Dos Mundos may refer to:
Dos Mundos (Rick Trevino album), 1993
Dos Mundos: Evolución + Tradición, a 2009 album by Alejandro Fernández
 Dos Mundos (newspaper), a bilingual newspaper in Kansas City